Leonard Byrd (born March 17, 1975, in Fort Rucker, Alabama) is an American sprinter who specializes in the 400 metres. His personal best time is 44.45 seconds, achieved in May 2002 in Belém, Brazil.  This was the fastest time of 2002.

He originally won the gold medal in the 4 × 400 metres relay at the 2001 World Championships in Edmonton, together with teammates Antonio Pettigrew,
Derrick Brew and Angelo Taylor, but the team was disqualified when Antonio Pettigrew admitted to using performance-enhancing drugs. He also competed in the individual distance, but only reached the semi-final.

Achievements

References

1975 births
Living people
American male sprinters
Universiade medalists in athletics (track and field)
Goodwill Games medalists in athletics
People from Fort Rucker, Alabama
Track and field athletes from Alabama
Universiade gold medalists for the United States
Medalists at the 1995 Summer Universiade
Competitors at the 2001 Goodwill Games
Goodwill Games gold medalists in athletics